"Fragment of a Novel" is an unfinished 1819 vampire horror story written by Lord Byron. The story, also known as "A Fragment" and "The Burial: A Fragment", was one of the first in English to feature a vampire theme. The main character was Augustus Darvell. John William Polidori based his novella The Vampyre (1819), originally attributed in print to Lord Byron, on the Byron fragment. The vampire in the Polidori story, Lord Ruthven, was modelled on Byron himself. The story was the result of the meeting that Byron had in the summer of 1816 with Percy Bysshe Shelley where a "ghost writing" contest was proposed. This contest was also what led to the creation of Frankenstein according to Percy Bysshe Shelley's 1818 Preface to the novel. The story is important in the development and evolution of the vampire story in English literature as one of the first to feature the modern vampire as able to function in society in disguise. The short story first appeared under the title "A Fragment" in the 1819 collection Mazeppa: A Poem, published by John Murray in London.

Plot
The story is written in an epistolary form with the narrator recounting the events that had occurred in a letter. The letter is dated 17 June 1816. The narrator embarks on a journey or "Grand Tour" to the East with an elderly man, Augustus Darvell. During the journey, Darvell becomes physically weaker, "daily more enfeebled". They arrive at a Turkish cemetery between Smyrna and Ephesus near the columns of Diana. Near death, Darvell reaches a pact with the narrator not to reveal his impending death to anyone. A stork appears in the cemetery with a snake in its mouth. After Darvell dies, the narrator is shocked to see that his face turns black and his body rapidly decomposes:

"I was shocked with the sudden certainty which could not be mistaken — his countenance in a few minutes became nearly black. I should have attributed so rapid a change to poison, had I not been aware that he had no opportunity of receiving it unperceived."

Darvell is buried in the Turkish cemetery by the narrator. The narrator's reaction was stoical: "I was tearless." According to John Polidori, Byron intended to have Darvell reappear, alive again, as a vampire, but did not finish the story. Polidori's account of Byron's story in a letter to his publisher in 1819 indicates it "depended for interest upon the circumstances of two friends leaving England, and one dying in Greece, the other finding him alive upon his return, and making love to his sister."

Major characters

 The Narrator, recounts the story in a letter
 Augustus Darvell, a wealthy, elderly man
 Suleiman, a Turkish janizary

Publication history

Byron's unfinished short story, also known as "A Fragment" and "The Burial: A Fragment", was appended to Mazeppa by the publisher John Murray in June 1819 in London without the approval of Byron. On 20 March 1820, Byron wrote to Murray: "I shall not allow you to play the tricks you did last year with the prose you post-scribed to 'Mazeppa,' which I sent to you not to be published, if not in a periodical paper, – and there you tacked it, without a word of explanation, and be damned to you."

Byron on vampirism

Byron wrote about his views on vampires and vampirism in his notes to the 1813 work The Giaour: A Fragment of a Turkish Tale:
The Vampire superstition is still general in the Levant. Honest Tournefort tells a long story about these 'Vroucolachas', as he calls them. The Romaic term is 'Vardoulacha'. I recollect a whole family being terrified by the scream of a child, which they imagined must proceed from such a visitation. The Greeks never mention the word without horror. I find that 'Broucolokas' is an old legitimate Hellenic appellation—the moderns, however, use the word I mention. The stories told in Hungary and Greece of these foul feeders are singular, and some of them most incredibly attested.

A vampire who returns to destroy his family is described in The Giaour, lines 757-768:

But first, on earth as vampire sent,
Thy corse shall from its tomb be rent:
Then ghastly haunt thy native place,
And suck the blood of all thy race;
There from thy daughter, sister, wife,
At midnight drain the stream of life;
Yet loathe the banquet which perforce
Must feed thy livid living corse:
Thy victims ere they yet expire
Shall know the demon for their sire,
As cursing thee, thou cursing them,
Thy flowers are withered on the stem.

In a 27 April 1819 letter, however, Byron disclaimed any interest in vampires: "I have besides a personal dislike to 'Vampires,' and the little acquaintance I have with them would by no means induce me to reveal their secrets."

Byron would be regarded as the originator or origin for the modern conception of the vampire in literature as a prominent member of society.

Ghost story contest

The vampire fragment was a product of the ghost story contest that occurred in Geneva on 17 June 1816, when Byron stayed at the Villa Diodati with author and physician John William Polidori. Their guests were Percy Bysshe Shelley, Mary Godwin, and Claire Clairmont. Mary recalled the contest and Byron's contribution in the 1831 introduction to Frankenstein:

'We will each write a ghost story,' said Lord Byron; and his proposition was acceded to. There were four of us. The noble author began a tale, a fragment of which he printed at the end of his poem of  Mazeppa.

In the 1818 preface to Frankenstein, Percy Bysshe Shelley described the contest with Lord Byron and John Polidori:
Two other friends (a tale from the pen of one of whom would be far more acceptable to the public than anything I can ever hope to produce) and myself agreed to write each a story, founded on some supernatural occurrence.

References

Sources
 Christopher Frayling, editor, with introduction. Vampyres: Lord Byron to Count Dracula. Faber and Faber, 1992. 
 John Clute and John Grant, editors. The Encyclopedia of Fantasy. Orbit, 1997, p. 154.
 Emmanuel Carrère. Gothic Romance (Original French title: Bravoure). (1984). English version published by Scribner, 1990. 
 Ken Gelder. Reading the Vampire. NY: Routledge, 1994.
 Seed, David. '"The Platitude of Prose": Byron's Vampire Fragment in the Context of his Verse Narratives', in Bernard Beatty and Vincent Newey, eds., Byron and the Limits of Fiction, Liverpool: Liverpool U.P., 1988, pp. 126–147.
 The Byronic Vampyre.
 A vampiric extract from The Giaour: A Fragment of a Turkish Tale (1813).
 Barber, Paul. Vampires, Burial, and Death: Folklore and Reality. Yale University Press, 1988.
 Tournefort, Joseph Pitton de. A Voyage Into the Levant, 1718. English edition, London: printed for D. Midwinter. Volume I, 1741.
 Bainbridge, S. "Lord Ruthven's Power: Polidori's 'The Vampyre', Doubles and the Byronic Imagination." The Byron Journal, 2006.
 Skarda, Patricia. "Vampirism and Plagiarism: Byron’s Influence and Polidori’s Practice." Studies in Romanticism, 28 (Summer 1989): 249–69.
 McGinley, Kathryn. "Development of the Byronic Vampire: Byron, Stoker, Rice." The Gothic World of Anne Rice, edited by Ray Broadus Browne and Gary Hoppenstand. Bowling Green State University Popular Press, 1996.
 Lovecraft, H. P. "Supernatural Horror in Literature." The Recluse, No. 1 (1927), pp. 23–59.
Stott, Andrew McConnell. "The Poet, the Physician and the Birth of the Modern Vampire", The Public Domain Review. Retrieved 7 August 2017.
Stott, Andrew McConnell. The Poet and the Vampyre: The Curse of Byron and the Birth of Literature’s Greatest Monsters. New York: Canongate/Pegasus, 2013.

External links

 Online edition of 'A Fragment', from Mazeppa by Lord George Byron, 1819.
 Audiorecording by Amy Gramour on the LibriVox website, selection 1, "The Burial: A Fragment" by George Gordon Lord Byron.
 Online version of 1819 collection Mazeppa with short story "A Fragment".
 "Le Vampyre, the Gothic Novel, and George Gordon, Lord Byron", 2003.
 BBC: "Lord Byron's image inspired modern take on vampires", 2010. "Byron was one of the first authors to write about vampires and his image even inspired the look of the monsters. Lord Byron has been credited as the inspiration for the modern suave bloodsuckers seen on TV and film."

Works by Lord Byron
Horror short stories
1819 short stories
1800s short stories
British horror novels
Vampire novels
Novels
Unfinished novels